Evans Douglas Rees (6 August 1923 – 5 November 2004) was an Australian rules footballer who played with Footscray in the Victorian Football League (VFL). Originally from Horsham, he spent a season with South Sydney before coming to Footscray.

Rees served in the Australian Army during World War II prior to playing with Footscray.

Notes

External links 

1923 births
2004 deaths
Australian rules footballers from Victoria (Australia)
Western Bulldogs players
South Sydney Football Club players
Australian Army personnel of World War II
Military personnel from Victoria (Australia)